The 5th Cape Grand Prix was a motor race, run to South African Formula One-style rules, held on 2 January 1962 at Killarney Motor Racing Complex, Cape Town, South Africa. The race was run over 60 laps of the circuit, and was won by British driver Trevor Taylor, in his Lotus 21.

There were no great differences between the local rules to which this race was run and the international Formula One rules, but for example sports car bodies were permitted, such as the Porsche special driven by Jennings.

The race was dominated by Taylor and Jim Clark, and they swapped the lead several times during the race, after Jo Bonnier had led for the first three laps. After Clark spun, Taylor was able to keep the lead for the last ten laps to take the victory.

Local driver Vic Proctor's homebuilt car with its Alfa Romeo engine was deemed unraceworthy by the race organisers, and was excluded before Proctor set a time in practice.

Results

References

 "The Grand Prix Who's Who", Steve Small, 1995.
 "The Formula One Record Book", John Thompson, 1974.
 Race results at www.silhouet.com 

Cape Grand Prix
Auto races in South Africa
Cape Grand Prix
Cape Grand Prix